The 7th New York Veteran Infantry Regiment was an infantry regiment in the Union Army during the American Civil War.  The regiment was active in the Eastern Theater.

Service
The 7th New York Veteran Infantry was organized at Hart Island (Bronx) and was mustered in by companies from March 29 to October 31, 1864, under the command of Colonel George W. Von Schack. The regiment included some men from the 7th New York Volunteer Infantry Regiment.

The some companies of the regiment were attached to the 52nd New York Volunteer Infantry until July 22, 1864, and upon completing recruitment it was assigned to the 1st Division, 2d Corps, Army of the Potomac, serving in both the 3rd Brigade and the Consolidated Brigade.

Detailed service
Siege of Petersburg, Va., July 22, 1864, to April 2, 1865. Demonstration north of the James River July 27-29, 1864. Deep Bottom July 27-29. Mine Explosion, Petersburg, July 30 (Reserve). Demonstration north of the James River August 13-20. Strawberry Plains, Deep Bottom, August 14-18. Ream's Station August 25. Reconoissance to Hatcher's Run December 9-10. Dabney's Mills, Hatcher's Run, February 5-7, 1865. Watkins House March 25. Appomattox Court House March 28-April 9. Hatcher's Run or Boydton Road March 29-30. White Oak Road March 31. Sutherland Station and fall of Petersburg April 2. Sailor's Creek April 6. High Bridge, Farmville, April 7. Appomattox Court House April 9. Surrender of Lee and his army. March to Washington, D.C., May. Grand Review May 23. Moved to Hart's Island, N.Y., and duty there till August. Mustered out August 4, 1865.

Casualties
The regiment lost during service 3 Officers and 52 Enlisted men killed and mortally wounded and 73 Enlisted men by disease. Total 128.

See also

 List of New York Civil War regiments
 New York in the Civil War

References

Military units and formations established in 1864
Military units and formations disestablished in 1865
Infantry 7